Swindled is an American true crime podcast written and hosted by an anonymous "concerned citizen", who has never revealed his identity. The scripted series explores the world of white-collar crime, political corruption, and corporate greed.

A German translation of the series titled Schmutzige Geschäfte launched on November 19, 2018.

Episodes

Season 1

Season 2

Season 3

Season 4

Season 5

Season 6

Season 7

Bonus Episodes

Reception 
The show has received positive reviews from critics. Vulture named the series one of the "52 Great True-Crime Podcasts [of] the post-Serial boom". The Star Tribune named the series one of its "10 must-listen true crime podcasts" in June 2018. In August that year, Digital Trends included the series on its list of best true crime podcasts. The Guardian also selected the series as its podcast "pick of the week" for the week of September 9, 2018.

Accolades 

 Listed as #10 in "Top Subscriptions" on Apple Podcasts' Best of 2021
Winner in the 2019 Discover Pods Awards for "Best True Crime Podcast"
 Runner-up in the 2019 Discover Pods Awards for "Best Overall Podcast" 
 Runner-up in the 2018 Discover Pods Awards for "Best True Crime Podcast"
 Finalist in the 2018 Discover Pods Awards for "Best New Podcast"

References 

2018 podcast debuts
True crime
Audio podcasts
Crime podcasts